Pierre-Yves Artaud (born 13 July 1946) in Paris, is a French classical flautist.

References

External links 
 Notice on Cdmc
 Discography on Discogs
  interview in Fa.la.ut n° 29, April-June 2006
 Private music lessons: Pierre-Yves Artaud, Flute Master & Teacher (YouTube)

1946 births
Living people
Musicians from Paris
French classical flautists
Conservatoire de Paris alumni
Academic staff of the Conservatoire de Paris